Dighari is a village in Katihar district, Bihar state, India,  from Katihar.

References

Villages in Katihar district